Bioinspiration & Biomimetics is a peer-reviewed journal that publishes research involving the study and distillation of principles and functions found in biological systems that have been developed through evolution. It was quarterly during 2006~2014 and became bimonthly in 2015.

The editor-in-chief is Robert J Full at the University of California, Berkeley, USA.

Abstracting and indexing
This journal is indexed by the following databases:
 Science Citation Index 
 Materials Science Citation Index
 Journal Citation Reports/Science Edition
 Medline/PubMed
 Scopus
 Inspec 
 Chemical Abstracts Service 
 Current Awareness in Biological Sciences 
 EMBiology  
 NASA Astrophysics Data System 
 VINITI Abstracts Journal (Referativnyi Zhurnal)

References

External links
Bioinspiration & Biomimetics
IOP Publishing

Biology journals
IOP Publishing academic journals
Publications established in 2006
Bimonthly journals